Tvoje Lice Zvuči Poznato is a Serbian talent show based on the Spanish franchise Your Face Sounds Familiar. The show began October 12, 2013 on Prva TV.

The show involves ten celebrities (singers, actors, TV personalities and sportsmen) portraying various iconic singers every week to win a financial donation for their chosen charity.

Format
Each celebrity gets transformed into a different musical performer, which is chosen by the show's "Randomiser", each week, and performs an iconic song and dance routine well known by that particular singer. Contestants are given an individual score based on their performance by each of the four judges. The points go between 2 and 12, with the exception of 11. Contestants also give five more bonus points to another fellow contestant of their choice. During the semi-final and final week viewers decide the winner via SMS vote.

The winner of each episode wins €1000, and the winner of the whole show wins €25000. All money goes to a charity of the winner's choice.

Judges and presenters
Contestants are judged by the celebrity panel consisted of three main judges and, prior to the grand finale, a guest judge.

The initial panel consisted of TV presenter Ivan Ivanović, singer and vocal coach Marija Mihajlović and actress Katarina Radivojević, who was replaced by actor and musician Branko Đurić in the second series. Musician Vlado Georgiev and season one winner Ana Kokić then filled in during the third series alongside Ivanović. Đurić returned to the show in season four and was joined by comedian and actor Andrija Milošević and singer Aleksandra Radović. Series four saw actress Dubravka Mijatović, artist Uroš Đurić and composer Dušan Alagić as main judges.

Guest judges have included Dragana Mirković, Lepa Brena, Slađana Milošević, Bora Đorđević, Miroslav Ilić, Aca Lukas, Severina, Kaliopi, Marija Šerifović, Željko Joksimović, Jelena Karleuša, Tony Cetinski, Nataša Bekvalac, Haris Džinović, Niggor, Karolina Gočeva, Tonči Huljić, Aleksandar Milić Mili, Tanja Bošković, Neda Arnerić, Milan Gutović, Milutin Karadžić, Sergej Trifunović, Hristina Popović, Ivan Bosiljčić, Mićko Ljubičić, Dejan Tomašević, Savo Milošević, Dušan Ivković, Nikola Rađen, etc.

TV presenter Marija Kilibarda co-hosted the show with actors Petar Strugar in the first series and Bojan Ivković in the second and also all by herself in the third and fifth season. She was replaced by actress Nina Seničar during the series four.

Series overview

Overall results of the show
 One of the participants had the honor of portraying one of the members of the jury, speaking directly in front of him:
In season 1, Goca Tržan performed in the image of Dragana Mirković (who gave 4 points), Tamara Dragičević performed in the image of Severina (who gave 5 points), Aleksa Jelić performed in the image of Miroslav Ilić (who gave 7 points) and Nataša Bekvalac (who gave 10 points), Wikluh Sky performed in the image of Marija Šerifović (who gave 10 points), Boris Milivojević performed in the image of Tony Cetinski (who gave 3 points).
In season 2, Zvonko Pantović Čipi performed in the image of Slađana Milošević (who gave 9 points), Tanja Savić performed in the image of Željko Joksimović (who gave 9 points), Neda Ukraden performed in the image of Kaliopi (who gave maximum 12 points).
In season 3, Bogoljub Mitić Đoša performed in the image of Knez (who gave 5 points) and Dragana Mirković (who gave minimum 2 points), Dara Bubamara performed in the image of Vlado Georgiev (who gave 9 points), Lepa Brena (who gave 6 points) and Aca Lukas (who gave 7 points), Katarina Ostojić Kaya performed in the image of Željko Joksimović (who gave 10 points).
In season 4, Nenad Pagonis performed in the image of Jelena Karleuša (who gave maximum 12 points), Mira Škorić performed in the image of Marija Šerifović (who gave maximum 12 points).
 Some participants portrayed their "colleagues":
In season 1, Boris Milivojević performed in the image of Ana Kokić, Wikluh Sky performed in the image of Željko Šašić, who performed in the image of Snežana Babić Sneki and Goca Tržan performed in the image of Knez.
In season 2, Ivan Jevtović performed in the image of Dragan Kojić Keba, Tanja Savić performed in the image of Neda Ukraden.
In season 3, Katarina Ostojić Kaya performed in the image of Ivana Peters, who performed in the image of Halid Muslimović, Neša Bridžis performed in the image of Dara Bubamara.
In season 4, Mira Škorić performed in the image of Edita Aradinović, who performed in the image of Tijana Dapčević, who performed in the image of Bebi Dol.
In season 5, Knez and Ivana Peters, Keba and Ana Kokić, Edita Aradinović and Željko Šašić performed in the image of each other.

See also
Survivor Srbija
Ples sa zvezdama

References

Serbian reality television series
Serbia
2013 Serbian television series debuts
Prva Srpska Televizija original programming